Lagocheirus jamaicensis is a species of longhorn beetles of the subfamily Lamiinae. It was described by Toledo and Hovore in 2005, and is known from Jamaica, from which its species epithet is derived.

References

Beetles described in 2005
Lagocheirus